The 1951–52 season was Chelsea Football Club's thirty-eighth competitive season. The club once more struggled in the First Division and finished 19th. In the FA Cup, Chelsea reached the semi-finals for the second time in three years, and once again lost to Arsenal after a replay. Manager Billy Birrell retired at the end of the season and was replaced by Ted Drake.

Table

References

External links
 1951–52 season at stamford-bridge.com

1951–52
English football clubs 1951–52 season